Charles Constantin may refer to:

 Charles Constantin (ice hockey) (born 1954), former ice hockey left winger
 Charles Constantin (conductor) (1835–1891), French conductor, violinist and composer